Mogi das Cruzes Basquete, is a Brazilian professional basketball team that is based in Mogi das Cruzes, São Paulo. The club's full name is Associação Desportiva Mogi das Cruzes. The club competes in the top-tier level national basketball league in Brazil, the Novo Basquete Brasil (NBB).

History
Mogi das Cruzes was founded in 1995, but ended operations in 2005 due to financial problems. In 2011, the club returned to activity governed by an entirely new board. In the same year, the team qualified for the first division of the São Paulo State Championship.

The tradition of basketball in Mogi das Cruzes started when the team played in the finals series of the São Paulo State Championship in 2003, against COC/Ribeirão Preto, which was one of the strongest teams in Brazil at the time. COC/Ribeirão Preto was led by the head coach Lula Ferreira. The series was won by COC/Ribeirão Preto.

In 2012, Mogi das Cruzes finished in third place in the Southeast Super Cup, and thus obtained a spot in the Brazilian Super Cup. The team won the Brazil Super Cup, returning to the top-tier level league of Brazilian basketball, the NBB.

Roster

Honors and titles

Latin America
 FIBA Americas League 
 Runners-up (1): 2018

Continental
 FIBA South American League 
 Champions (1): (2016) 
 Runners-up (1): 2014

National
 Brazilian League 
 Runners-up (1): 2018
 Brazilian Super Copa (Brazilian Supercup) 
 Winners (1): 2012

Regional
 São Paulo State Championship
  Champions (2): 1996, 2016
 Runners-up (3): 1998, 2003, 2015

Head coaches
 Jorge "Guerrinha" Guerra

References

External links
Official website 
Latinbasket.com Profile

Basketball teams in Brazil
Novo Basquete Brasil
Mogi das Cruzes
Basketball teams established in 1995
Basketball in São Paulo (state)
1995 establishments in Brazil